Munition Support Squadrons (MUNSS) are geographically separated units which are located over Europe. They are co-located on several main operating NATO bases and they are working together with their host nation wing. Their common strength varies between 125 – 150 servicemembers.

Their mission: receiving, storing, maintenance and maintaining custody and control of NATO assigned special USAFE munitions until further notice. When directed the MUNSS will provide the special munitions to the NATO strike wing commander. Therefore the MUNSS mission is one of the most critical within their theater of operations.

All details regarding nuclear deployments within NATO remain secret. The only officially acknowledged information is that the standoff (air-dropped) weapons concerned are currently B-61 types which are managed through the Weapons Storage and Security System (WS3).  WS3 has been constructed in the 1980s and comprised construction of secured vaults – each capable to contain 4 weapons – in the floors of the aircraft shelters. The co-storage of the special weapons together with their strike aircraft greatly enhanced their survivability and operational readiness. In 1986 the Pentagon released a list of airbases in Europe and in the Far East which have been WS3 equipped.

After the collapse of the Soviet Union and the Warsaw Pact the number of NATO airbases and the number of operational WS3 has considerably been reduced. In 2017 Hans M. Kristensen, the director of the Nuclear Information Project with the Federation of American Scientists (FAS) in Washington declared that the numbers of NATO assigned US nuclear weapons in Europe have not been changed since 2009 so it is supposed that they are currently still operational in Turkey, Italy, Germany, Belgium and in the Netherlands.

In 2021, the Pentagon briefly posted a picture of the unit insignia of the 701st Munitions Support Squadron at Kleine Brogel Air Base, Belgium which depicted US and Belgian flags above an eagle clutching a B-61 weapon. The photo, dated from March 2021, was removed soon after it drew media attention.

Munitions Squadrons (MUNS) 

 31st Munitions Squadron: Aviano Air Base, under USAF 31st Fighter Wing (F16)
 39th Weapons System Security Group: Incirlik Air Base, under USAF 39th Air Base Wing
 48th Munitions Squadron: RAF Lakenheath, under USAF 48th Fighter Wing (F-15)
 52nd Munitions Maintenance Group: Spangdahlem Air Base, commanding 4 dislocated squadrons (MUNSS)
 701st Munitions Support Squadron: Kleine Brogel Air Base, supporting Belgian 10 Tactische Wing (F16)
 702nd Munitions Support Squadron: Büchel Air Base, supporting German Taktisches Luftwaffengeschwader 33 (Tornado IDS)
 703rd Munitions Support Squadron: Volkel Air Base, supporting Netherlands 1st Fighter Wing (F16)
 704th Munitions Support Squadron: Ghedi Air Base, supporting Italian 6º Stormo (Tornado IDS)
 Operating Location Ramstein: Ramstein Air Base, for maintenance on weapons storage and security systems within the EUCOM AOR, scheduled maintenance at European inactive sites, WS3 unscheduled and STMS periodic maintenance at USAFE active sites.
 86th Munitions squadron: Ramstein Air Base, under 86th Airlift Wing
 18th Munitions Squadron: Kadena Air Base, under USAF 18th Fighter Wing (F-15)

Former Squadrons 

 605th Munitions Support Squadron: Memmingen Air Base,  (1993-1996)
 7261st Munitions Support Squadron: Memmingen Air Base,  (1963-1993)
 7391st Munitions Support Squadron: Balıkesir Air Base,  (1966-1993)
 7392nd Munitions Support Squadron: Eskişehir Air Base,  (1962-1990)
 7393rd Munitions Support Squadron: Mürted Air Base,  (1965-1994)
 7394th Munitions Support Squadron: Malatya Erhaç Air Base,  (1963-1990) 
 7401st Munitions Support Squadron: Rimini Air Base,  (1961-1993) 
 7502nd Munitions Support Squadron: Nörvenich Air Base,  (1962-1993)

See also 
 List of United States Air Force squadrons

References

Munitions